Night and Day may refer to:

Film, theatre, and television
 Night and Day (1946 film), an American film based on the life of Cole Porter
 Night and Day (1991 film), a French film directed by Chantal Akerman
 Night and Day (2008 film), a South Korean film directed by Hong Sang-soo
 Night and Day (ballet), an 1883 ballet with choreography by Marius Petipa and music by Ludwig Minkusllet
 Night and Day (play), a 1978 play by Tom Stoppard
 Night and Day (TV series), a British soap opera

Literature 
 Night and Day (Parker novel), a 2010 novel by Robert B. Parker
 Night and Day (Woolf novel), a 1919 novel by Virginia Woolf
 Night and Day, a defunct magazine edited by Graham Greene

Music

Albums
 Night and Day (Joe Jackson album), 1982
 Night and Day (Red Rodney album), 1981
 Night and Day (Willie Nelson album), 1999
 Night and Day, by John Davis and the Monster Orchestra, 1976
 Night & Day (Gemma Hayes album), 2014
 Night & Day (Keshia Chanté album), 2011
 Night & Day (The Secret Handshake album), 2010
 Night & Day (The Vamps album), 2017
 Night & Day: Big Band, by Chicago, 1995

Songs
 "Night and Day" (song), written by Cole Porter, 1932
 "Night and Day" (Bette Midler song), 1990
 "Night and Day" (Dawn Penn song), 1994
 "Night and Day", by Léo Ferré from Il n'y a plus rien, 1973

Venues and events
 Night and Day Concert, a 1984 performance by Elton John
 Night+Day, a 2013 series of three festival-style concerts held by the xx
 The Night and Day Café, a music venue in Manchester, England

Other 
 Night and Day, a diamond jewellery brand owned by F. Hinds
 Night 'n Day, a convenience store chain in New Zealand

See also 
 Day and Night (disambiguation)
 Knight and Day, a 2010 film starring Tom Cruise and Cameron Diaz
 Natt och Dag (lit. Night and Day), a Swedish noble family
 Nite and Day, a 1988 song by Al B. Sure!